Ardices glatignyi, the black and white tiger moth, is a moth in the family Erebidae that is found in Australia. The species was first described by Le Guillou in 1841. Formerly included in Spilosoma, but later generic status of Ardices was proved by Vladimir Viktorovitch Dubatolov (2005). The larvae are polyphagous, and are known to feed on Lantana camara, Acanthus mollis, and Tradescantia albiflora.

References
 (2005). "On the status of the Australian genus Ardices F. Walker, 1855 with the description of a new subgenus for A. curvata Donovan, 1805 (Lepidoptera, Arctiidae)". Atalanta. 36 (1/2): 173-179, 394-395 (colour plate 10).

External links

glatignyi
Moths of Australia